Pinedale is a locality in west-central Alberta, Canada within Yellowhead County. It was designated a hamlet between 1987 and 2019.

History 
Pinedale was designated a hamlet by the Government of Alberta on August 26, 1987 for the purpose of accessing funding for the installation of a communal low pressure sewage
system. Yellowhead County repealed the hamlet designation on February 26, 2019.

See also 
List of communities in Alberta

References 

Former hamlets in Alberta
Localities in Yellowhead County
Yellowhead County